Dana Trabulsy (born March 31, 1964) is an American politician serving as a member of the Florida House of Representatives from the 84th district. She assumed office on November 3, 2020. She lives in Fort Pierce, Florida.

References 

1964 births
Living people
People from Fort Pierce, Florida
Republican Party members of the Florida House of Representatives
Women state legislators in Florida
21st-century American women